Vogler's Cove  is a community of about 200 people in the Canadian province of Nova Scotia, located in the Lunenburg Municipal District in Lunenburg County.

References
Vogler's Cove on Destination Nova Scotia

Communities in Lunenburg County, Nova Scotia
General Service Areas in Nova Scotia